EGL may refer to:

Computing 
 EGL (API), an OpenGL interface 
 EGL (programming language)

Other uses 
 Eesti Gaidide Liit, an Estonian Guides Association
 Elektrizitäts-Gesellschaft Laufenburg, a Swiss energy company
 Emilian dialect of the Emilian-Romagnol language
 Engility, an American defense company
 Enterprise Group (Ghana), a Ghanaian insurance company
 European Gemological Laboratory; see Diamond clarity
 Elegant Gothic Lolita; see Lolita fashion
 Neghelle Airport, Ethiopia (IATA code EGL)